Elkus / Manfredi Architects is an architectural firm based in Boston, Massachusetts founded in 1988 by David Manfredi and the late Howard F. Elkus (1938–2017), both fellows of the American Institute of Architects. Its international projects include Sochi Grand Marina and the Galleria at Sowwah Square. In 2014–2015, the firm did lead preliminary design work on the abortive Boston bid for the 2024 Summer Olympics proposals.

Manfredi graduated with Bachelor degrees from the University of Notre Dame and received a Masters from the University of Chicago. He was previously a vice president at The Architects Collaborative in Cambridge.

Selected works

The Village at USC
Americana
Emerson College's Paramount Theatre (Boston, Massachusetts) (2009) – complete renovation and major expansion, including new student residence hall
The Modern – highrise residential complex
Assembly Square (195 units) and AVA Somerville (253 units) – apartment buildings 
A section of The Galleria, Al Maryah Island
The House by Starck and Yoo, a high rise condominium building with interior design by Philippe Starck and Yoo in Victory Park, Dallas
InterContinental Boston – hotel
33 Arch Street in Boston
CityPlace (West Palm Beach)
College Avenue Campus, Rutgers-New Brunswick(2016)
10 Hudson Yards – retail space
200 Amsterdam
New Brunswick Performing Arts Center
The Harbor Mérida.
Woodlawn Residential Commons, University of Chicago

See also
List of tallest buildings in Boston

References

Architecture firms based in Massachusetts
Companies based in Boston
Design companies established in 1988